The 290th Military Police Brigade is a Military Police unit of the United States Army.

History
 Constituted in the US Army Reserve on 1 November 1971, as HHC, 290th MP Brigade, activated at Nashville, Tennessee and assigned to the Third US Army.
 Reassigned 1 October 1973, to the First United States Army.
 Reassigned to the Second United States Army on 1 October 1983. Inactivated on 15 October 1985, at Nashville, Tennessee.
 Reactivated to the 200th Military Police Command on 17 September 2010.

Insignia
The partizans were medieval weapons. They are crossed to indicate control of exit and entry. The circular embattled area is symbolic of the prisoner of war camps and military security facilities commanded and operated by the brigade. The two partizans, nine sides of the nonagon and circular center allude to the numerical designation (2-9-0) of the unit.

Subordinate units 

As of 2017 the following units are subordinated to the 290th Military Police Brigade:

 290th Military Police Brigade, in Nashville, Tennessee
 160th Military Police Battalion (I/R) (EPW/CI), in Tallahassee, Florida
 304th Military Police Battalion (I/R) (EPW/CI), in Nashville, Tennessee
 317th Military Police Battalion (CS), in Tampa, Florida
 535th Military Police Battalion (I/R) (EPW/CI), in Cary, North Carolina
 724th Military Police Battalion (I/R) (EPW/CI), in Fort Lauderdale, Florida

References

Military units and formations of the United States Army Reserve
Military Police Brigades of the United States Army